Blastocladia is a genus of aquatic fungi.

Description
Blastocladia species have a thallus that consists of a single, branched basal cell or trunk with rhizoids at one end and sporangia at the other. They are not able to use oxygen, although its presence does not inhibit growth.

Habitat
Members of Blastocladia grow on submerged twigs and fruit.

Taxonomy
Blastocladia was circumscribed by German scientist Paul Friedrich Reinsch in 1877, who included a single species, Blastocladia pringsheimii. Roland Thaxter added a second species, B. ramosa in 1896. He placed the genus provisionally in the Pythiaceae owing to its resemblance of its resting spores to the conidia of some members of the genus Pythium. Joseph Schröter (1897) included it with the water mold family Leptomitaceae.

Species
, Index Fungorum accepts 30 species in Blastocladia:
Blastocladia angusta A.Lund 1934
Blastocladia arborata S.N.Dasgupta & R.John 1989
Blastocladia aspergilloides Crooks 1937
Blastocladia bonaerensis Steciow & Marano 2006 – Argentina
Blastocladia caduca S.N.Dasgupta & R.John 1989
Blastocladia coronata S.N.Dasgupta & R.John 1989
Blastocladia didyma S.N.Dasgupta & R.John 1989
Blastocladia elegans S.N.Dasgupta & R.John 1989
Blastocladia excelsa S.N.Dasgupta & R.John 1989
Blastocladia filamentosa S.N.Dasgupta & R.John 1989
Blastocladia fruticosa S.N.Dasgupta & R.John 1989
Blastocladia fusiformis S.N.Dasgupta & R.John 1989
Blastocladia globosa Kanouse 1927
Blastocladia glomerata Sparrow 1936
Blastocladia gracilis Kanouse 1927
Blastocladia heterosporangia S.N.Dasgupta & R.John 1989
Blastocladia incrassata Indoh 1940
Blastocladia mammillata S.N.Dasgupta & R.John 1989
Blastocladia pileota S.N.Dasgupta & R.John 1989
Blastocladia pringsheimii Reinsch 1877
Blastocladia prolifera Minden 1912
Blastocladia pusilla S.N.Dasgupta & R.John 1989
Blastocladia ramosa Thaxt. 1896
Blastocladia rostrata Minden 1912
Blastocladia sessilis S.N.Dasgupta & R.John 1989
Blastocladia sparrowii Indoh 1940
Blastocladia spiciformis S.N.Dasgupta & R.John 1989
Blastocladia strangulata Barrett 1912
Blastocladia tenuis Kanouse 1927
Blastocladia truncata Sparrow 1932

References

External links

Aquatic fungi
Blastocladiomycota
Fungus genera